El Argoub or El Aargub (arabic : العركوب) is a town in the disputed territory of Western Sahara. It is administered by Morocco as a rural commune in Oued Ed-Dahab Province of the region of Dakhla-Oued Ed-Dahab. At the time of the 2004 census, the commune had a total population of 5345 people living in 1012 households.

References

Populated places in Oued Ed-Dahab Province
Rural communes of Dakhla-Oued Ed-Dahab